The 1981–82 season of the Moroccan Throne Cup was the 26th edition of the tournament.

Raja Club Athletic won the cup, beating Renaissance de Kénitra 1–0 in the final, played at the stade Roches Noires in Casablanca. Raja Club Athletic won the competition for the third time in their history.

Tournament

Last 16

Quarter-finals

Semi-finals

Final 
The final featured the winners of the two semi-finals, Raja Club Athletic and Renaissance de Kénitra, on 14 March 1982 at the Stade Roches Noires in Casablanca.

Notes and references 

1981
1981 in association football
1982 in association football
1981–82 in Moroccan football